Phoebe mafra is a species of beetle in the family Cerambycidae. It was described by Martins and Galileo in 1998. It is known from Brazil.

References

Hemilophini
Beetles described in 1998